The 1912 Navy Midshipmen football team represented the United States Naval Academy during the 1912 college football season. In their second season under head coach Douglas Legate Howard, the team compiled a  record, shut out four opponents, and defeated its opponents by a combined score of 125 to 61.

The annual Army–Navy Game was played on November 30 at Franklin Field in Philadelphia; Navy

Schedule

References

Navy
Navy Midshipmen football seasons
Navy Midshipmen football